Guarenas-Guatire conurbation  or Guarenas-Guatire metropolitan area   (  or Area Metropolitana de Guarenas-Guatire), also known as El Nuevo Este de Caracas (New East of Caracas), is a conurbation area in Miranda, Venezuela, that includes 2 municipalities, it is part of the Greater Caracas Area. It has a population of 473,728 inhabitants.

Cities
The principal cities of the area are (2013):
 Guarenas (pop. 264,290)
 Guatire (pop. 159,725)
 Araira (pop. 49,713)

Municipalities

The 2 municipalities of the area are:

Transportation

The Guarenas / Guatire Metro is a dual subway / light rail system project to connect the twin cities and intermediate communities to Caracas.

See also
 Greater Caracas
 List of metropolitan areas of Venezuela

External links

 Estado Miranda
 guarenasonline.com
 plaza-miranda.gob.ve 
 zamora-miranda.gob.ve

References

Caracas
Geography of Miranda (state)
Metropolitan areas of Venezuela
Guarenas